In set theory and logic, Buchholz's ID hierarchy is a hierarchy of subsystems of first-order arithmetic. The systems/theories  are referred to as "the formal theories of ν-times iterated inductive definitions". IDν extends PA by ν iterated least fixed points of monotone operators.

Definition

Original definition 
The formal theory IDω (and IDν in general) is an extension of Peano Arithmetic, formulated in the language LID, by the following axioms:
 
  for every LID-formula F(x)
 

The theory IDν with ν ≠ ω is defined as:
 
  for every LID-formula F(x) and each u < ν

Explanation / alternate definition

ID1 
The language of ID1, is obtained from that of first-order number theory, by the addition of a set (or predicate) constant IA for every X-positive formula A(X, x) in LN[X] that only contains X (a new set variable) and x (a number variable) as free variables. The term X-positive means that X only occurs positively in A (X is never on the left of an implication). We allow ourselves a bit of set-theoretic notation:

 
  means 

Then ID1 contains the axioms of first-order number theory (PA) with the induction scheme extended to the new language as well as these axioms:

 
 

Where  ranges over all  formulas.

Note that  expresses that  is closed under the arithmetically definable set operator , while  expresses that  is the least such (at least among sets definable in ).

Thus,  is meant to be the least pre-fixed-point, and hence the least fixed point of the operator .

IDν 
To define the system of ν-times iterated inductive definitions, where ν is an ordinal, let  be a primitive recursive well-ordering of order type ν.

The system IDν is now obtained from the system of first-order number theory (PA) by expanding the induction scheme to the new language and adding the scheme  expressing transfinite induction along  for an arbitrary  formula  as well as the axioms:

 
 

where  is an arbitrary  formula. In  and  we used the abbreviation  for the formula , where  is the distinguished variable.

We then define .

Variants 
This subtle difference makes the system significantly weaker: , while .

 is  weakened even further. In , not only does it use fixed points rather than least fixed points, and has induction only for positive formulas. This once again subtle difference makes the system even weaker: , while .

The amount of weakening compared to regular iterated inductive definitions is identical to removing bar induction given a certain subsystem of second-order arithmetic. , while .

It is not exactly a first-order arithmetic system, but captures what one can get by predicative reasoning based on ν-times iterated generalized inductive definitions.

Results 
 Let ν > 0. If a ∈ T0 contains no symbol Dμ with ν < μ, then "a ∈ W0" is provable in IDν.
 If a -sentence  is provable in IDν, then there exists  such that .
 If the sentence A is provable in IDν for all ν < ω, then there exists k ∈ N such that .

Proof-theoretic ordinals 

References 
 An independence result for 
 Iterated inductive definitions and subsystems of analysis: recent proof-theoretical studies
 Iterated inductive definitions in nLab
 Lemma for the intuitionistic theory of iterated inductive definitions
 Iterated Inductive Definitions and 
 Large countable ordinals and numbers in Agda
Ordinal analysis in nLab

Ordinal numbers
Proof theory
Set theory
Mathematical logic